The West Branch of the Upper Ammonoosuc River is a  river in northern New Hampshire in the United States. It is a tributary of the Upper Ammonoosuc River and part of the Connecticut River watershed. For most of its length, it is within the White Mountain National Forest.

The West Branch rises in the township of Kilkenny, New Hampshire, in a basin on the east side of Mount Cabot, the highest peak in the Pilot Range. The river flows east into Berlin, passing the Berlin National Fish Hatchery at York Pond before joining the Upper Ammonoosuc River.

See also 

 List of New Hampshire rivers

References

Rivers of New Hampshire
Tributaries of the Connecticut River
Rivers of Coös County, New Hampshire